Jim "Purple Hoss" Fauver (born 1943) is a Canadian football player who played for the Edmonton Eskimos. He played college football at Texas Christian University.

References

Living people
1943 births
Edmonton Elks players